Sandor Funtek is a French actor.

His father, an artist, originated from Hungary, while his mother, also an artist, was from a French-speaking background.

Roles

Film

2013 : Blue is the Warmest Colour : Valentin
2013 : Rôdeurs : (voice)
2014 : Jennah
2015 : L'Homme au lion : the young man
2015 : Dheepan : the guardian
2015 : 8 Coups : Tom
2015 : Une famille : Samir
2016 : A Wedding : Frank
2016 : Zin'naariya! : Sandor
2016 : DeadBoy : Enzo
2016 :  : Milord
2017 : Nico, 1988 : Ari
2017 : Rikishi
2018 :  : Kéké
2018 : Tumultueuses : Liam
2019 :  : Dylan
2019 :  : Andy
2019 : Adoration 
2020 :  : Ulysse Fravielle
2020 : Kandisha : Erwan
2020 : Suprêmes : Kool Shen

References

External links
 

Living people
French actors
French people of Hungarian descent
Year of birth missing (living people)